Charles Claude Ange Monneron (5 April 1735, in Antibes, Alpes-Maritimes – 30 May 1799, in Annonay) was a French businessman, banker and politician. He was intendant général of Pondichéry (making a fortune with the French East India Company), député to the Estates General of 1789 then to the National Constituent Assembly.

Family
His brother Paul Mérault Monneron was an engineer, and his other brothers Louis Monneron (1742–1805) and Pierre Antoine Monneron (1747–1801) were respectively députés of the National Constituent Assembly for the East Indies and Mauritius. Another brother, Joseph François Augustin Monneron (1756–1826) was député for Paris at the Legislative Assembly and retired from it in 1792, before becoming Director General of the Caisse des Comptes Courants and going bankrupt in 1798.

1735 births
1799 deaths
People from Antibes
Deputies to the French National Convention
People of French India